Guys Snack Foods is a snack foods manufacturer and distributor based in Overland Park, Kansas, with its target market being the Midwest.

It claims to have been the first company to sell barbecue-flavored potato chips. The company's biggest product line is its potato chips, but it also offers cheese puffs, tortilla chips and pretzels. 

The company was founded by Guy and Frances Caldwell in 1938 as "Guy's Nut and Candy Company", so named because it sold roasted peanuts throughout the Kansas City area. 

At one time the company had 1,000 employees in its Liberty, Missouri plant. It was sold to Borden Food Corporation in 1979. Borden sold it in 1994. It went into bankruptcy in 2001.

It has since emerged from bankruptcy and is now based in Kansas.

References

External links
guys-snacks.com

Brand name potato chips and crisps
Snack food manufacturers of the United States
Companies based in Overland Park, Kansas
1938 establishments in Kansas
American companies established in 1938
Food and drink companies established in 1938